Huey Joel Deckard (March 7, 1942 – September 6, 2016) was an American businessman and politician who served two terms as a U.S. Representative from Indiana from 1979 to 1983.

Early life and career 
Born in Vandalia, Illinois, Deckard attended public schools in Mount Vernon, Indiana. He attended the University of Evansville from 1962 to 1967, and served in the Indiana National Guard from 1966 to 1972.

Deckard was affiliated with broadcasting stations in southern Illinois and Indiana from 1959 to 1972. He was a cable television executive and legislative liaison for the Illinois-Indiana TV Association from 1974 to 1977. Deckard also formed a corporation involved in design and construction of energy-efficient and solar-heated homes and offices.

He served as member of the Indiana House of Representatives from 1966 to 1974.

Congress 

Deckard was elected as a Republican to the Ninety-sixth and to the Ninety-seventh Congresses (January 3, 1979 – January 3, 1983). He was an unsuccessful candidate for reelection in 1982 to the Ninety-eighth Congress, losing to then-Bloomington mayor Frank McCloskey. Initially favored for reelection to a third term, Deckard was involved in an automobile accident three weeks before the election.  He refused to take a blood test and was charged with driving under the influence. McCloskey sought to tie Deckard to President Ronald Reagan at a time of high unemployment in the district. When McCloskey defeated Deckard, Deckard became the sixth incumbent from 1966 to 1982 to lose reelection in the district known as the "Bloody Eighth."

Later career and death 
Deckard ultimately moved to Florida, where he became a computer technical specialist for Citibank in Tallahassee. A supporter of Pat Buchanan, he was the Reform Party's nominee for U.S. Senator in 2000.  Deckard's 17,338 votes, only 0.30% of the total votes cast, became the subject of statistical analysis by critics of the butterfly ballot in Palm Beach county.

He lived in Little Elm, Texas in his retirement. He died of an apparent heart attack on September 6, 2016 at a hospital in McKinney, Texas.

References

1942 births
2016 deaths
Republican Party members of the Indiana House of Representatives
People from Vandalia, Illinois
People from Mount Vernon, Indiana
People from Little Elm, Texas
Businesspeople from Indiana
Military personnel from Indiana
University of Evansville alumni
Reform Party of the United States of America politicians
Candidates in the 2000 United States elections
20th-century American politicians
20th-century American businesspeople
Republican Party members of the United States House of Representatives from Indiana